Langley was a federal electoral district in the province of British Columbia, Canada, that was represented in the House of Commons of Canada from 2004 to 2015. It was a 327 km2 in area with 117,858 people located in the suburbs of the Lower Mainland.

History

The electoral district was created in the 2003 Representation Order with 82,070 people from the former riding of Langley—Abbotsford, and 28,976 people from South Surrey—White Rock—Langley. This new riding includes the City of Langley, the Township of Langley, and the Indian reserves of Katzie IR No. 2, Matsqui IR No. 4 and McMillan Island IR No. 6.

As per the 2012 electoral redistribution, this riding was dissolved into Langley—Aldergrove and Cloverdale—Langley City for the 2015 election.

Members of Parliament 

Its Member of Parliament was Mark Warawa, a former loss prevention officer. He was first elected in the 2004 election. He is a member of the Conservative Party of Canada caucus.  He serves as a member on the Legislative Committee on Bill C-38 and the Standing Committee on Justice, Human Rights, Public Safety and Emergency Preparedness.  During the 40th Parliament, he was the parliamentary secretary to the Minister of the Environment and served as a member of the Standing Committee on Environment and Sustainable Development. Warawa died from pancreatic cancer on June 20, 2019. No by-election was held before the 2019 Canadian federal election.

Election results

See also 
 List of Canadian federal electoral districts
 Past Canadian electoral districts

References

 Library of Parliament Riding Profile
 Canadian Census, 2001 profile
 Campaign expense data from Elections Canada - 2008
 Results - 2004
 Expenditures - 2004
SI/2003-154: Electoral Boundaries Readjustment Act: Proclamation Declaring the Representation Order to be in Force Effective on the First Dissolution of Parliament that Occurs after August 25, 2004, Canada Gazette Part II, Vol. 137, No. 6 Extra, 29 August 2003
2003 Representation Order Transposition of Population

Notes

Former federal electoral districts of British Columbia
Langley, British Columbia (city)
Langley, British Columbia (district municipality)
Federal electoral districts in Greater Vancouver and the Fraser Valley
Politics of Langley, British Columbia (city)